This article lists the 3,243 counties and county equivalents of the United States. The 50 states of the United States are divided into 3,007 counties, political and geographic subdivisions of a state; 236 other local governments and geographic places are also first-order administrative divisions of their respective state/district/territory, but are called by different names. The latter are referred to collectively as county equivalents by the United States Census Bureau. The 236 county equivalents include 100 equivalents in the territories (such as those in Puerto Rico) outside the 50 states and the District of Columbia. The large majority of counties and equivalents were organized by 1970. Since that time, most creations, boundary changes and dissolutions have occurred in Alaska and Virginia.

Among the 50 states, 44 are partitioned entirely into counties, with no county equivalents. Louisiana is instead divided into 64 equivalent parishes, while Alaska is divided into 19 equivalent boroughs and 11 sparsely populated census areas, the latter also known collectively as the unorganized borough. Virginia is composed of a mixture of 95 counties and 38 independent cities. Maryland, Missouri and Nevada are each composed entirely of counties, except that each also has exactly one independent city: Baltimore, St. Louis, and Carson City, respectively. The District of Columbia is a single federal district that is not part of any state or county. All of the above 136 exceptional cases are reckoned as county equivalents. The number of counties (or equivalents) per state ranges from the three counties of Delaware, to the 254 counties of Texas. In New England, where the town model predominates, several counties have no corresponding local governments, existing only as historical, legal, and census boundaries. These are the counties of Connecticut and Rhode Island, as well as eight of Massachusetts' 14 counties. In all, the 50 states consist of 3,142 counties and equivalents. Adding the District of Columbia gives 3,143.

Similarly, the Census Bureau treats 100 subdivisions of the territories of the United States as county equivalents. These are the 78 municipalities of Puerto Rico, the three major islands of the U.S. Virgin Islands, the three districts and two atolls of American Samoa, Guam as a single island and county equivalent, the four municipalities of the Northern Mariana Islands, and the nine island territories of the U.S. Minor Outlying Islands.  As in the states, each territorial county equivalent has its own INCITS/FIPS codes.

Table
The following table lists the 3,243 counties and county equivalents of the United States with the following information for each entity:

 The entity name
 The state or equivalent (federal district or territory)
 The population as of April 1, 2020 as estimated by the United States Census Bureau was 331,449,281.
 The core-based statistical area if designated by the Office of Management and Budget

See also

 Outline of the United States
 Index of United States-related articles
 Index of U.S. counties
 Lists of counties in the United States
 List of former United States counties
 List of FIPS state codes
 List of United States FIPS codes by county
 United States Office of Management and Budget
 Statistical area (United States)
 Combined statistical area (list)
 Core-based statistical area (list)
 Metropolitan statistical area (list)
 Micropolitan statistical area (list)

Notes

References

External links
 United States Government
 United States Census Bureau
 United States Office of Management and Budget

Counties and county equivalents
Equivalents
County equivalents
Counties and county equivalents